The United States Ambassador to the United Nations International Organizations in Vienna is the diplomatic representative of the United States to those organizations of the United Nations Office in Vienna.

Organizations include: the International Atomic Energy Agency, the Comprehensive Nuclear-Test-Ban Treaty Organization, the United Nations Office for Outer Space Affairs and the United Nations Office on Drugs and Crime, among others. The position is formally split into two permanent representative-level positions, titled the United States Permanent Representative to the Vienna Office of the United Nations and United States Permanent Representative to the International Atomic Energy Agency, each of which requires a separate Senate confirmation. Because the representative holds the rank of an ambassador, they are commonly referred to by this title.

Representatives

References from the State Department, unless otherwise indicated.
Richard S. Williamson – Political appointee
Appointed: May 17, 1983
Terminated mission: January 15, 1985
Bruce Chapman – Political appointee
Appointed: August 1, 1985
Terminated mission: October 16, 1988
Michael H. Newlin – Career FSO
Appointed: August 12, 1988
Terminated mission: September 6, 1991
John B. Ritch III – Political appointee
Appointed: November 22, 1993
Terminated mission: January 1, 2001
Kenneth C. Brill – Career FSO
Appointed: October 1, 2001
Terminated mission: June 29, 2004
Gregory Schulte – Political appointee
Appointed: June 29, 2005
Terminated mission: June 20, 2009
Glyn T. Davies – Career FSO
Appointed: August 12, 2009
Terminated mission: November 30, 2011
Joseph Macmanus – Career FSO
Appointed: September 27, 2012
Terminated mission: August 27, 2014
Laura Holgate – Political appointee
Appointed: June 27, 2016
Presentation of Credentials: July 18, 2016
Termination of Mission: January 18, 2017
Jackie Wolcott – Political appointee
Appointed: September 26, 2018
Presentation of Credentials: October 23, 2018
Termination of Mission: January 18, 2021
Laura Holgate - Political appointee
Appointed (Vienna Office): December 18, 2021
Presentation of Credentials (Vienna Office): February 1, 2022
Appointed (IAEA): March 29, 2022
Presentation of Credentials (IAEA): April 8, 2022

References
State Department, Chiefs of Mission for the U.N. Vienna Office

United Nations International Organizations
Representatives of the United States to the United Nations International Organizations in Vienna
Permanent Representatives of the United States to the United Nations
Permanent Representatives to the United Nations in Vienna